The Message, published in 1996 and written by K. A. Applegate, is the fourth book in the Animorphs series.  It is narrated by Cassie.

Plot summary
Cassie and Tobias are having strange dreams about a presence in the ocean. Jake sees a news item on television about debris with what looks like Andalite lettering on it that has washed up on the beach, and when he shows it to the others, Cassie and Tobias have such strong visions that they momentarily pass out. The Animorphs decide to investigate, and acquire dolphin morphs to do so.

While out in the ocean, they find a humpback whale under attack by a group of sharks.  The Animorphs fight the sharks and drive them off, and Marco is nearly killed in the process. Marco is able to morph back to his human form, and the whale, grateful, saves him from drowning.  The whale speaks to Cassie through song, telling her about a strange place of grass and trees under the ocean. Cassie has a feeling that this place is of Andalite origin, and the Animorphs wonder if Cassie's and Tobias's visions are a sort of distress call from an Andalite trapped in the ocean. They decide that the distress call is connected to the morphing ability, and Cassie and Tobias feel it the strongest because Cassie is the most in control of her morphing ability and Tobias is trapped in a morph. They also figure out that Visser Three could be receiving the message and that the Yeerks are probably looking for the lost Andalite as well.

The Andalite's location is too far from the shore for the Animorphs to reach under the two-hour morphing limit, so they (except Tobias) morph into seagulls and stow away on a large container ship (called the Newmar, from Monrovia, headed towards Singapore) that is heading in the right direction. They abandon ship and morph to dolphin when they are in range and discover the dome of an Andalite Dome Ship deep beneath the ocean's surface. They enter through an airlock and meet Aximili-Esgarrouth-Isthill.  Marco quickly gives him the nickname Ax, and the Animorphs tell him that he is the only survivor of the Andalite-Yeerk battle in Earth orbit and that they met and received the morphing power from Prince Elfangor. Ax reveals that Elfangor was, in fact, his older brother. Ax is also a youth, which is why he was left in the separated Dome ship during the battle. 

The meeting is brief however, as the Yeerks discover the sunken Dome ship and begin to drop depth charges. Ax had previously acquired a tiger shark, and he and the Animorphs escape. They are pursued by Visser Three in Mardrut morph; as they tire, Visser Three gains on them. The Animorphs decide to make a last stand, but are saved when Visser Three is attacked and chased off by a pod of sperm whales. The whales give the tired Animorphs a ride back to the shore.

Ax pledges to fight with the Animorphs and adopts Jake as his prince. He acquires Jake, Rachel, Cassie, and Marco and mixes the DNA from each to create his own human morph.  The Animorphs decide to hide him in the woods near Cassie's farm.

Morphs

TV adaptation
The Message was adapted into an episode of the same name of the Animorphs TV series, which aired on Nickelodeon and YTV.  

The television episode has elements of the 23rd book, The Pretender, namely the relationship between predator and prey, represented by Tobias and a rabbit he tries to hunt but is unable to, due to visions that throw him off his attack.
Visser Three morphs directly from human into a monster in order to terrorize a human-Controller, something impossible to do in the book series.
In the TV episode, the Animorphs find Ax in an abandoned factory area, rather than in the crashed dome ship on the seabottom, as in the books.
Cassie's first morph was a rabbit, and then a skunk.

Reviews
A review in School Library Journal calls the book "average series fare" with "stock characters", although the reviewer did praise the descriptions of animals and called Cassie's personal struggles realistic.

Re-release
Scholastic re-released The Message with a new lenticular cover in September 2011.

References

External links
Official page at Scholastic.com

Animorphs books
1996 science fiction novels
1996 American novels
Underwater novels